Puerto Pinasco is a town located in the Presidente Hayes Department, of Paraguay.

References

Populated places in the Presidente Hayes Department